Cory Chisel and The Wandering Sons is an Americana, folk rock band that started in Appleton, Wisconsin.  The band consists of Cory Chisel and Adriel Denae. Past members include Rick Setser, Paul Mannone, Miles Nielsen, Daniel McMahon, Adam Plamann, Noah Harris, and Charles Koltak. The band gets its name from the wandering, fluid nature of the musicians that work with Chisel and Denae.

The band was signed to RCA Records subsidiary Black Seal Music in 2007. Black Seal has since ceased to exist and the band remains independent.

The band has performed on "Late Night with Jimmy Fallon," "Conan" and "The Late Show with David Letterman." They've also been a part of several major music festivals, including Bonnaroo in 2011.

Chisel and the Wandering Sons toured in support of Norah Jones in 2012. Chisel also helped launch a music festival, Mile of Music, in Appleton, Wisconsin, where he spent several years of his youth. Its first year, 2013, featured Rodney Crowell, Justin Townes Earle and Norah Jones.

Chisel is the co-founder of The Refuge Foundation for the Arts, a nonprofit based in Appleton which provides support for artists.

He's also part of a three-man Americana group called Traveller. The other members are Jonny Fritz and Robert Ellis. Their debut album, recorded at the Refuge, was released in 2018.

Discography
Originally calling themselves simply The Wandering Sons the band, which included Cory Chisel, released their debut album entitled Again From The Beginning in 2004.  Two past self-released albums include Darken Your Door (EP) and Little Bird.  After signing with Black Seal, the band released their Cabin Ghosts EP in summer of 2008.
In 2009, the band released the album Death Won't Send a Letter.
In 2012, the band released the album Old Believers on Brendan Benson's Readymade Records. A new record is to be recorded and likely released in 2014.

The track Getting By from Little Bird was featured in the 2008 Samuel Jackson film Cleaner.

 Again From The Beginning (2004)
 Darken Your Door (2005)
 Little Bird (2006)
 Cabin Ghosts (2008)
 Death Won't Send A Letter (2009)
 Old Believers (2012)
 Tell Me True (2017) Released as Cory Chisel and Adriel Denae.

Awards
Chisel was named the "Artist of the Year" at the 2010 Wisconsin Area Music Industry awards. The group's song Born Again was awarded Song of the year and Death Won't Send a Letter was named the "Record of the Year".

Chisel was nominated for a Grammy Award in 2016 in the Best American Roots Song category for co-writing the song "The Traveling Kind" with Emmylou Harris and Rodney Crowell. The song was released on Harris and Crowell's album of the same name. The award went to Jason Isbell for "24 Frames."

References

American folk rock groups
Musical groups from Wisconsin